Reidar Vallis Håkan Jönsson (born June 16, 1944, Malmö) is a Swedish author. He is best known for the 1983 semi-autobiographical novel Mitt liv som hund, which was adapted into the film My Life as a Dog. His co-written screenplay for the film was recognized with a nomination at the 60th Academy Awards.

Bibliography
1969 – Endast för vita
1970 – En väldig borg
1971 – En borgares död
1972 – Emilia Emilia!
1973 – Hemmahamn
1976 – Svenska bilder
1976 – Levande livet!
1977 – Hemmahamn och sjöfolk
1978 – Röster från ett varv
1980 – Kvinnliga brottstycken
1982 – Farfar på rymmen
1983 – Mitt liv som hund
1985 – Vägarbete
1987 – Vägval
1988 – En hund begraven
1993 – Svenska hjältar
1994 – Gå på vatten
2002 – C'est vrai! 
2009 – Trampa däck
2010 – Hundens paradis
2011 – Springa läck
2012 – Vad mitt öga såg
2016 - En God Man
2017 - Vännen i Havanna
2017 - Kasta Loss
2019 - Dikt Midskepps
2020 - Tomhetens Triumf

External links
 Libris

Swedish novelists
Swedish screenwriters
1944 births
Living people